Equinox is an Amiga demo group with an active period between the years 1987-1996.

The name Equinox was not used from the beginning. In the early days the group were called themselves "The Powerlords", or sometimes "The Powerlords Corporation" (TPL), which consisted of sections in Sweden, Norway and the United Kingdom. At the end of 1990, just after The Powerlords and Aurora's Amiga Halloween Conference, TPL was about to break up. Some members did have some short adventures in other groups at this time. In December 1990 the former organizers of the United Kingdom, Sweden and Norway sections decided to keep the best members and change the group name to Equinox. Some time later, a group from Switzerland that was active for many years as 'Equinoxe', cut off the 'e' and joined Equinox.

Equinox released a bit over 30 Amiga demos and intros, and also got well known for releasing the disk magazine European Top 20, a combined chart and magazine in the years 1992 to 1993. Their demo party arranged together with Horizon in Eskilstuna 1993 assembled 500 persons.

Up until 1993, Equinox was a pure demo group, but then started to grow at large in the trading and board scene as well. Many traders and some of Sweden's biggest boards at the time joined the group. Equinox primetime chart, the European Top 20, reflected this by having many board-scene-related categories and articles.

Productions (excerpt) 
 European Top 20 (disk magazine, 1992-1993)
 Beast of Prey (10th at "The Computer Crossroad" demoscene party, 1993)
 Sonical Fantasia (march, 1993)
 In A Dream (April, 1994)
 Hydrocephalus II (4th at The Gathering, 1995)

See also

References

External links 
 Homepage
 Group entry on Pouët
 Group Entry on Demozoo

Demogroups